Brown's Inlet is a body of water in central Ottawa. A former creek, it grew considerably in size with the creation of the Rideau Canal, into which it now empties. Originally considerably larger, the inlet was shortened and divided so that today on the surface it is two ponds, but they are connected underground. The inlet is in the southern part of the Glebe neighbourhood, emptying into the canal near the Bank Street Bridge. The two ponds of the inlet are surrounded by parks and expensive homes. The ponds are home to a wide array of wild life including frogs, turtles, fish, and birds.

Landforms of Ottawa
Inlets of Canada
Bodies of water of Ontario
Rideau Canal